Geshmiran (also Romanized as Geshmīrān and Gashmiran; also known as Keshmīrān) is a village in Geshmiran Rural District, in the Central District of Manujan County, Kerman Province, Iran. At the 2006 census, its population was 421, in 106 families.

References 

Populated places in Manujan County